These are the Official Charts Company's UK Dance Chart number one hits of 2008. The dates listed in the menus below represent the Saturday after the Sunday the chart was announced, as per the way the dates are given in chart publications such as the ones produced by Billboard, Guinness, and Virgin.

Chart history

See also
List of number-one singles of 2008 (UK)
List of UK Indie Chart number-one singles of 2008
List of UK Rock Chart number-one singles of 2008
List of UK R&B Chart number-one singles of 2008
List of UK Dance Albums Chart number ones of 2008

References
General

Specific

External links
Dance Singles Chart at the Official Charts Company
UK Top 40 Dance Singles at BBC Radio 1

2008
2008 in British music
United Kingdom Dance Singles